Nahangi Karim Sarani (also Romanized as Nahangī Karīm Sārānī) is a village in Dust Mohammad Rural District, in the Central District of Hirmand County, Sistan and Baluchestan Province, Iran. At the 2006 census, its population was 159, in 28 families.

References 

Populated places in Hirmand County